Herbert Robin Cayzer, 3rd Baron Rotherwick (born 12 March 1954), is a British landowner and estate manager. He sat as a hereditary peer in the House of Lords for the Conservative Party, from 1996 until his retirement in 2022.

Early life
Robin Cayzer was born on 12 March 1954. He is the son of Herbert Cayzer, 2nd Baron Rotherwick, and Sarah Jane Slade, of the Slade baronets. He spent his early childhood at Bletchingdon Park, a Palladian country house in Oxfordshire. When he was 13, the family moved to Cornbury Park, in the same county, where he still lives.

He attended Harrow School and the Royal Military Academy, Sandhurst. He was further educated at the Royal Agricultural College, Cirencester, where he graduated with a Diploma in Agriculture (GDA) in 1982.

Career
Between 1973 and 1976, Cayzer was Acting Captain of The Life Guards and between 1977 and 1983, of the Household Cavalry. He worked for Barings Bank from 1976 to 1978 and for Bristol Helicopters from 1978 to 1980.

A qualified pilot, he represented the Popular Flying Association as a member of the executive committee from 1997 to 2001, and as vice-chairman from 1999 to 2001. He is also president of the General Aviation Awareness Council and a director of the Light Aviation Association.

In 1996, he succeeded to his father's peerage title, and took up his seat in Britain's upper chamber as a Conservative. The passing of the House of Lords Act 1999 saw him elected as one of the 92 hereditary peers to remain in their seats for life. His areas of interest are listed as agriculture, animals, food and rural affairs; aviation; defence; energy and environment.

In 2005, he became a Fellow of the Industry and Parliament Trust. He belongs to the All Party Parliamentary Group for Motorcycling. He is also a Patron of the National Association for Bikers with a Disability.

Since 2004, he has been board director of Cayzer Continuation PCC Ltd and since 2006, non-active chairman of Air Touring Ltd. According to his register of interests on the House of Lords website, he is a director of Cornbury Estates Company Limited and Cornbury Maintenance Company Ltd (both described as property companies) and of Bygone Engineering. Cornbury Park has about 5,000 acres of land, including part of the old royal forest of Wychwood. Cayzer has developed business units for rental there, and hosts the Wilderness Festival music festival.

Personal life

Cayzer married Sara Jane McAlpine on 6 March 1982 and they were divorced in 1994. They have three children. He married secondly Tania Fox on 21 June 2000.

Children by his first wife:

 The Honourable Harriette Cayzer (1986) she married Frederick Turner in 2014. They have two children:
 Isobel Turner (13 October 2016)
 Alfred Turner (4 January 2019)
 The Honourable Herbert Cayzer (10 July 1989) he married Allison Boynton on 22 August 2015. They have one son: 
 Herbert Robin Cayzer (13 October 2017)
 The Honourable Henry Cayzer (1991) he married Delaney Ford on 31 August 2019.

Children by his second wife:
 The Honourable August Cayzer (25 November 2000)
 The Honourable Tommy Cayzer (2 March 2003 – April 2003)

Lord Rotherwick succeeded to the Cayzer baronetcy of Gartmore on the death of his kinsman Sir James Arthur Cayzer, 5th Baronet, on 27 February 2012.

He is a second cousin twice removed of Labour and Co-operative politician Stella Creasy through his great-grandfather Conservative politician Sir Charles Cayzer, 1st Baronet on her maternal side.

References

1954 births
Cayzer family
Living people
People from Oxfordshire
People educated at Harrow School
Graduates of the Royal Military Academy Sandhurst
Alumni of the Royal Agricultural University
Barons in the Peerage of the United Kingdom
British Life Guards officers
British philanthropists
Conservative Party (UK) hereditary peers
Hereditary peers elected under the House of Lords Act 1999